Ainhoa may refer to:

 Ainhoa, Pyrénées-Atlantiques, France
 Ainhoa, a common name for women in the Basque Country:
 Ainhoa Cantalapiedra Spanish singer
 Ainhoa Arteta, Spanish soprano
 Ainhoa Murúa, Spanish triathlete
 Ainhoa Tirapu, Spanish footballer